Ian Douglas may refer to:

Ian Douglas (author), pseudonym of American author William H. Keith, Jr.
Ian Douglas (bishop), American bishop
Ian Douglas (politician), Dominican politician

See also

Iain Douglas-Hamilton (born 1942), zoologist
Ian Akers-Douglas (1909–1952), English cricketer

Douglas (disambiguation)
Ian (disambiguation)